Kundra is a village in Dataganj block, Budaun district, Uttar Pradesh, India. Its village code is 128297. Budaun railway station is 32 KM away from the village. According to 2011 Census of India population of the village is 2,054, in which 1,126 are males and 928 are females.

References

Villages in Budaun district